Mingzong is an imperial temple name used for Chinese emperors. It may refer to:

 Li Siyuan (867–933, reigned 926–933), Emperor Mingzong of Later Tang
 Khutughtu Khan Kusala (1300–1329, reigned in 1329), Emperor Mingzong of Yuan

See also
 Myeongjong (disambiguation) (Korean equivalent)
 Minh Tông (disambiguation) (Vietnamese equivalent)

Temple name disambiguation pages